Comedy! is a 1987 French drama film  written and directed by Jacques Doillon.

The film was entered into the main competition at the 44th edition of the Venice Film Festival.

Plot

Cast 

 Jane Birkin as Her
 Alain Souchon  as  Him

References

External links

1987 drama films
1987 films
Films directed by Jacques Doillon
French drama films
Films scored by Gabriel Yared
Films scored by Philippe Sarde
1980s French films